Negative Outlook is the first EP by Sworn Enemy, released in 2001 on Stillborn Records. It was re-released in 2004.

Track listing

Personnel
 Sal Lococo - vocals
 Lorenzo Antonucci - guitar
 Mike Raffinello - guitar
 Jimmy Sagos - bass guitar
 Paul Wallmaker - drums

Sworn Enemy albums
2000 EPs